The 1967–68 Sheffield Shield season was the 66th season of the Sheffield Shield, the domestic first-class cricket competition of Australia. Western Australia won the championship. In October 1967, Ian Brayshaw of Western Australia took ten wickets in an innings against Victoria.

Table

Statistics

Most Runs
John Inverarity 726

Most Wickets
Alan Connolly 46

References

Sheffield Shield
Sheffield Shield
Sheffield Shield seasons